Albanian Supercup 2009 is the 16th edition of the Albanian Supercup since its establishment in 1989. The match was contested between the 2009 Cup winners KS Flamurtari and the 2008–09 Albanian Superliga champions KF Tirana.

Details

See also
 2008–09 Albanian Superliga
 2008–09 Albanian Cup

References

RSSSF.com

2009
Supercup
Albanian Supercup, 2009
Albanian Supercup, 2009